Thomas Charlton Henry (25 March 1887 – 24 January 1936) was an American philatelist who signed the Roll of Distinguished Philatelists in 1929.

References

Signatories to the Roll of Distinguished Philatelists
American philatelists
1887 births
1936 deaths